Bullan Weijden (1901–1969) was a Swedish stage and film actress. She was married to the composer Alvar Kraft.

Selected filmography
 The Song to Her (1934)
 Hotel Paradise (1937)
 Baldwin's Wedding (1938)
 Kalle's Inn (1939)
 A Sailor on Horseback (1940)
 Sunny Sunberg (1941)
 Sun Over Klara (1942)
 Turn of the Century (1944)
 Love Goes Up and Down (1946)
 The Great Amateur (1958)

References

Bibliography

External links 
 

1901 births
1969 deaths
Swedish film actresses
Swedish stage actresses